The Colorado Christian Cougars are the athletic teams that represent Colorado Christian University, located in Lakewood, Colorado, in NCAA Division II intercollegiate sports. The Cougars compete as members of the Rocky Mountain Athletic Conference for all 13 varsity sports.

Varsity Sports

Teams

Men's sports
 Baseball
 Basketball
 Cross Country
 Golf
 Soccer
 Track & Field

Women's sports
 Basketball
 Cross Country
 Golf
 Soccer
 Softball
 Track & Field
 Volleyball

References

External links